Unknown Woman is a 1935 American drama film directed by Albert S. Rogell and starring Richard Cromwell, Marian Marsh and Douglass Dumbrille.

Cast
 Richard Cromwell as Larry Condon
 Marian Marsh as Helen Griffith
 Douglass Dumbrille as Phil Gardner
 Henry Armetta as Joe Scalise
 Arthur Hohl as Lansing
 George McKay as Gus
 Robert Middlemass as Hammacher
 Nana Bryant as Aunt Mary
 Arthur Vinton as Whitney
 Jerry Mandy as Tony
 Ben Taggart as Shanley
 Nellie V. Nichols as Rosa
 Robert Wilber as Mitch 
 Eddy Chandler as Hank
 Edward LeSaint as Night Court Judge
 Arthur Rankin as Parker
 Hooper Atchley as Newcomb
 George Guhl as Lt. Wilson

References

Bibliography
 Dick, Bernard F. Columbia Pictures: Portrait of a Studio. University Press of Kentucky, 2015.

External links
 

1935 films
1935 drama films
1930s English-language films
American drama films
Films directed by Albert S. Rogell
American black-and-white films
Columbia Pictures films
1930s American films